The Argentine Ambassador to Paraguay is the Ambassador of the Argentina government to the government of Paraguay.

References

Paraguay
 
Argentina